Lotegorisch or Lottegorisch or Lekoudesch (older own description: lochne kodesch, from the  = "tongue, language", and kodesch = "holy") is a trading language and Palatine variant of the secret language, Rotwelsch, spoken in the Leiningerland (especially in Carlsberg), where in the late 18th century many vagrants, including many Jews, were settled and where many of them worked as cattle traders, itinerant craftsmen, and peddlers.

References

Literature 
Anton Meißner: Die pfälzische Handelssprache Lotegorisch. Wörterbuch mit Leseproben. Meißner Verlag, Wattenheim, 1999 (printed as a manuscript)

External links 
 www.lotegorisch.de (archived version at archive.org @ 2019-01-22)
 Lekoudesh - Manchestor Working Group on Language Contact
 Lekoudesh - Archive of Endangered and Smaller Languages

German dialects
Anterior Palatinate
Palatinate Forest
Occupational cryptolects